Vieki is a small village in Finland in the town of Lieksa, North Karelia. It is situated on the northern stand of the lake Viekijärvi.

Lieksa
Villages in Finland